Peter McDonald (6 January 1924 – 29 March 2022) was an Irish footballer. He competed in the men's tournament at the 1948 Summer Olympics. He played for Bohemian F.C. and Transport F.C. in the League of Ireland.

He worked for railway company Córas Iompair Éireann until his retirement in the 1980s. A fan of Shelbourne F.C., he volunteered as head groundsman at Tolka Park during the 1990s and 2000s.

Having been the last surviving Irish Olympic Games footballer, McDonald died on 29 March 2022, aged 98.

References

External links
 
 

1924 births
2022 deaths
Place of birth missing
Republic of Ireland association footballers
Association football forwards
Olympic footballers of Ireland
Footballers at the 1948 Summer Olympics
League of Ireland players
Bohemian F.C. players
Transport F.C. players